Grad bez ljudi (English: City without people) is a song by Croatian recording artist Severina.

Track list

Croatian promo single

Serbian maxi single

References

Croatian songs
2012 singles
2012 songs